The West Indies Rugby Union was established in 1975 and is the governing body of the twelve West Indies Unions (Bahamas, Barbados, Bermuda, British Virgin Islands, Cayman, Guadeloupe, Guyana, Jamaica, Martinique, St Lucia, St Vincent and Trinidad & Tobago).

The West Indies 7s team competes annually at the Carib 7s in Trinidad, the Deloitte 7s in the Cayman Islands and on the iRB Sevens World Series, competing at the 2001 Hong Kong 7s, Cardiff and Twickenham, Argentina and Chile in 2002, Los Angeles in 2005 and 2006 and in San Diego in 2007 and 2008.

2008 USA Sevens

Notable players 

 Luther Burrell
 Derek Hurdle Jr.
 Claudius Butts
 Brendan O’Farrell
 Kurt Johnson (former Coventry and Orrell winger)
 Geoff Gregory
 Mark Hamilton
 Jonathan Cassidy
 Ronald Silverthorne
 Kevin MacKenzie
 Theo Henry
 Dan McGavern

See also
 NAWIRA

   
National rugby sevens teams
National sports teams of the West Indies
Former national rugby union teams